Amangkurat III (Amangkurat Mas; died in Dutch Ceylon (now Sri Lanka), 1734) was a short-lived susuhunan (ruler) of the Sultanate of Mataram, who reigned 1703–1705. When his father Amangkurat II of Mataram died, he soon lost his half-uncle Prince Puger in the First Javanese War of Succession, which lasted on for five years until the Dutch managed to install Prince Puger as Pakubuwono I. Amangkurat was deposed, but not caught until 1707. He was subsequently exiled to Ceylon, where he later died.

Origin 
Born as Raden Mas Sutikna, according to the Babad Tanah Jawi, he was the only child of Amangkurat II, as his mother had used magic on another of Amangkurat II's wives to make them unable to conceive of child. Sutikna was also nicknamed Pangeran Kencet (Prince Heel), due to the deformity in his heel.

It is said that Sutikna was bad-tempered, temperamental, and a jealous man, especially if he knew there was another more handsome man. When acting as adipati anom (crown prince), he married his cousin, Raden Ayu Lembah, daughter of Prince Puger (future Pakubuwono I). Nevertheless, he divorced his wife due to her infidelity with Raden Sukra, son of Patih Sindureja. Raden Sukra was then murdered by Sutikna's bodyguard, and Prince Puger was forced to put capital punishment on her daughter, Lembah. Sutikna then married Raden Ayu Himpun, sister of Lembah.

Conflict with Prince Puger 
Amangkurat III ascended to throne in Kartasura, succeeding his father Amangkurat II who died in 1703. According to the Babad Tanah Jawi, the wahyu keprabon (heavenly mandate) actually fell on Prince Puger. The latter was supported by numerous officials who disliked the new king, which made Amangkurat III disturbed. He divorced Himpun and made a wive from Onje village (now in Mrebet, Purbalingga Regency) as his new queen consort.

Pressure by his family caused Raden Suryokusumo (son of Prince Puger) to rebel. The feared Amangkurat III immediately placed Prince Puger and his family in captivity. They were released after persuasion by Patih Sumabrata. Support by Prince Puger to seize power began again. Amangkurat III ultimately sent his follower to assassinate Prince Puger and his family in 1704, but the target had escaped to Semarang.

Leaving Kartasura 
Prince Puger in Semarang was supported by the Dutch East India Company (VOC), with condition that was beneficial to the latter. He designated himself as sultan, styled Pakubuwono I. His troops moved in 1705 to seize Kartasura. Amangkurat III built fortifications in Ungaran, led by his uncle, Prince Arya Mataram, who secretly supported Pakubuwono I.

Arya Mataram was successful in persuading Amangkurat III to leave Kartasura. He himself eventually joined Pakubuwono I, his own older brother.

This short-lived reign of Amangkurat III's was the result of Amangkurat I's curse on Amangkurat II, who the latter had poisoned the drink of his father when escaping from Mataram due to the Trunajaya rebellion in 1677.

According to the Babad Tanah Jawi, Amangkurat II was cursed on the condition that his descendants that would become a king, except for one, would rule only for a short period. The Babad Tanah Jawi was, however, written in the era of Pakubuwono I's descendants, thus its accuracy is difficult to prove.

First Javanese War of Succession

Amangkurat III's group escaped to Ponorogo bringing all royal heirlooms. There, he tortured Duke Martowongso, but only due to a misunderstanding. All the people from Ponorogo rebelled after their regent was tortured. Amangkurat III then escaped to Madiun, after which he escaped to Kediri.

Untung Suropati, an anti-Dutch Regent of Pasuruan immediately sent troops to protect Amangkurat III. Troops of the Ducth as well as of the people of Kartasura, Madura, and Surabaya moved to invade Pasuruan in 1706. During a battle in Bangil, Untung Suropati was killed in action and his sons then joined with Amangkurat III in Malang.

Amangkurat III had suffered much in 1707 because he was chased by Pakubuwono I's troops. Amangkurat III subsequently moved to Blitar, then to Kediri, and ultimately decided to surrender in Surabaya in 1708.

Exiled to Ceylon 
Prince Blitar, son of Pakubuwono I, arrived in Surabaya and persuaded Amangkurat III to hand over all royal heirlooms, but he refused. Amangkurat III was only willing to give it directly to Pakubuwono I.

The Dutch East India Company then moved Amangkurat III to Batavia (now Jakarta), after which he was banished to Ceylon. Amangkurat III died there 26 years later.

It is said that the Mataram royal heirlooms had been brought to Ceylon. But Pakubuwono I tried to be resolute by announcing that the actual Javanese heirlooms were in the Demak Great Mosque and the tomb of Sunan Kalijaga in Kadilangu, Demak.

References
 Miksic, John N. (general ed.), et al. (2006)  Karaton Surakarta. A look into the court of Surakarta Hadiningrat, central Java (First published: 'By the will of His Serene Highness Paku Buwono XII'. Surakarta: Yayasan Pawiyatan Kabudayan Karaton Surakarta, 2004)  Marshall Cavendish Editions  Singapore  
 Moeis A. 1999. Surapati. cet. 11. Jakarta: Balai Pustaka
 Babad Tanah Jawi, Mulai dari Nabi Adam Sampai Tahun 1647. (transl.). 2007. Yogyakarta: Narasi
 Ricklefs MC. 2001. A History of Modern Indonesia: 3rd Edition. Palgrave and Stanford University Press.
 Moedjianto. 1987. Konsep Kekuasaan Jawa: Penerapannya oleh Raja-raja Mataram. Yogyakarta: Kanisius
 Purwadi. 2007. Sejarah Raja-Raja Jawa''. Yogyakarta: Media Ilmu.

Sultans of Mataram
Kartasura
Javanese monarchs
18th-century monarchs in Asia
Dethroned monarchs
1734 deaths
18th-century Indonesian people
17th-century Indonesian people
Indonesian royalty